Brookmans Park railway station serves the village of Brookmans Park in Hertfordshire, England.

History

The station was opened by the London and North Eastern Railway (LNER) on 19 July 1926.

During World War II, the station played a small part in the signing of the Anglo-Soviet Treaty. On 21 May 1942, LNER Class A4 locomotive number 4495 Golden Fleece brought Soviet foreign minister Vyacheslav Molotov to the station, where he was met by his British counterpart Anthony Eden. The pair and their staff were then driven to the Chequers estate, where the treaty was negotiated.

Facilities

The station is only staffed part-time, with the ticket office being open 06:5010:00, Monday to Friday. Customer help points are available for assistance out of hours. Other facilities include passenger information displays and waiting shelters. Oyster Cards are not valid at the station. However, contactless bank cards may be used.

Station layout

The station has four platforms in total, consisting of two island platforms; only platforms 1 and 4, facing the route's slow lines, are used regularly. Both platforms are accessible only via a footbridge, with no step-free access available. A station car park with 69 spaces parallels the island platforms to the east. The station building (an LNER survivor) at the north-west of the station serves as the part-time ticket office.

Services
All services at Brookmans Park are operated by Great Northern using  EMUs.

The typical off-peak service in trains per hour is:
 2 tph to 
 2 tph to 

During the peak hours, the service is increased to 4 tph in each direction.

Late evening and weekend services used to run to and from  rather than Moorgate, but from 13 December 2015 Great Northern introduced a weekend service on the line and extended evening hours until the end of service.

References

External links

Railway stations in Hertfordshire
DfT Category E stations
Former London and North Eastern Railway stations
Railway stations in Great Britain opened in 1926
Railway stations served by Govia Thameslink Railway